En Vivo!!! Y a Todo Calor (Live And At Full Heat) (1991) is the eighth album and second live album by Mexican rock and blues band El Tri.

Recorded at the Hollywood Palladium, this was the first large scale concert in the United States for the band. In the liner notes, the band acknowledges the efforts of Mexican immigrants to survive in the United States.

Track listing 
All tracks by Alex Lora

 "Perro Negro y Callejero" (Black And Stray Dog) – 3:40 (Chavo de Onda, 1973)
 "Viejas de Vecindad" (Neighborhood's old hags) – 4:52 (Una Leyenda Viva Llamada El Tri, 1990)
 "Nunca Digas Que No" (Never Say No) – 6:00 (Hecho en México, 1987)
 "Oye Cantinero" (Hey, Bartender) – 5:15 (Three Souls in My Mind III, 1972)
 "Un Día en la Vida" (A Day In Life) – 5:14 (21 Años Después, Alex Lora y El Tri, 1989)
 "Metro Balderas" (Balderas Subway) (Alex Lora, Rockdrigo) – 5:10 (Simplemente, 1984)
 "Nocivo Para la Salud" (Harmful To Health) – (Otra Tocada Mas, 1988)
 "María Sabina" – 5:00 (21 Años Después, Alex Lora y El Tri, 1989)
 "Que Viva el Rock and Roll" – 3:03 (Three Souls in My Mind III, 1972)
 "Mente Rockera" (Rocking Mind) – 4:50 (La Devaluación, 1975)
 "Encuentros Cercanos del 3er Sexo" (Close Encounters of The Third Sex) – 5:50 (21 Años Después, Alex Lora y El Tri, 1989)
 "El As No Conocido" (The Unknown As) (Lora, Sergio Mancera) – 2:51 (21 Años Después, Alex Lora y El Tri, 1989)
 "Millones de Niños" (Millions Of Children) – 6:45 (Una Leyenda Viva Llamada El Tri, 1990)
 "Abuso de Autoridad" (Authority Abuse) – 3:22 (Chavo de Onda, 1973)

Album and year of original release inside parenthesis

Personnel 

 Alex Lora – guitar, vocals
 Rafael Salgado – harmonic
 Felipe Souza – electric & rhythm guitar
 Eduardo Chico – guitar
 Pedro Martínez – drums
 Ruben Soriano – bass

External links
www.eltri.com.mx
En Vivo!!! Y a Todo Calor at MusicBrainz
[ En Vivo!!! Y a Todo Calor] at Allmusic

El Tri live albums
1991 live albums
Warner Music Group live albums